Chelsie Florence Preston Crayford (born 1987) is a New Zealand actress.

Early life
Preston Crayford was born in Wellington to film maker Gaylene Preston and musician Jonathan Crayford. Apart from appearing in a water safety commercial at the age of four, her acting debut was at the age of 13 in the New Zealand-made TV series A Twist in the Tale starring William Shatner. Several years later, her performance in a stage production was praised by Ian McKellen, encouraging her to pursue an acting career and enrol in the Toi Whakaari national drama school from 2006 to 2008. She graduated in 2008 with a Bachelor of Performing Arts.

Career
Preston Crayford played a guest role in the soap opera Shortland Street in 2003, and made her feature film debut in the comedy Eagle vs Shark in 2007. In 2009, she played a major role in the TV series The Cult. In 2011, she played brothel madam Tilly Devine in the Australian crime drama Underbelly: Razor, a role for which she won the Graham Kennedy Award for Most Outstanding Newcomer at the 2012 Logie Awards.

Since then she has appeared in an ABC TV adaptation of The Mystery of a Hansom Cab, in Hope and Wire (a mini-series produced by her mother about the 2010 Canterbury earthquake), and as government communications advisor Sophie Walsh in the Australian techno-thriller The Code.

References

External links

1987 births
21st-century New Zealand actresses
AACTA Award winners
Living people
Logie Award winners
New Zealand film actresses
New Zealand television actresses
People educated at Wellington East Girls' College
Toi Whakaari alumni